Route 9 is a , four-lane freeway beginning in Old Saybrook and ending at I-84 near the Farmington–West Hartford town line. It connects the Eastern Coastline of the state along with the Lower Connecticut River Valley to Hartford and the Capital Region.

Route description
Route 9 is a four-lane freeway for most of its length. It begins at I-95/U.S. 1 exit 69, on the west bank of the Connecticut River. Along the river, it passes through the towns of Essex, Deep River, Chester, Haddam, and Middletown). After its junction with Interstate 91 in Cromwell, Route 9 continues westward then northward, running through the Hartford area towns/cities of Berlin, New Britain, Newington, and Farmington. At the junction with I-84/US 6 near the Farmington - West Hartford town line, Route 9 follows the ramps for eastbound I-84 and ends at the merge with I-84 immediately after crossing the town line.

Route 9 has a non-freeway portion in the downtown area of Middletown, where it overlaps with Route 17. One of these intersections is where Route 17 leaves Route 9 to join Route 66. ConnDOT may soon consider upgrading the at-grade interchanges of the expressway and make on/off ramps.

The section from I-95 in Old Saybrook to I-91 in Cromwell is known as the Chester Bowles Highway. The section from I-91 in Cromwell to exit 24 in Berlin is known as the Korean War Veterans Memorial Highway. The section from Route 72 in New Britain to Route 175 in Newington is known as the Taras Shevchenko Expressway. The section from Route 175 in Newington to the junction with I-84 is known as the Iwo Jima Memorial Expressway.

History
The road connecting Deep River (then known as Saybrook) and Wethersfield along the west bank of the Connecticut River was a toll road known as the Middlesex Turnpike, which operated from 1802 to 1876. Another toll road running from Hartford to the northwest corner of Granby was known as the Granby Turnpike and operated from 1800 to 1854.

The state took over maintenance of trunk highways at the beginning of the 20th century. In 1922, New England began publicly numbering its state roads. The road running from Old Saybrook to the Massachusetts state line in Granby was designated as part of Route 10, a multi-state route continuing all the way to northern New Hampshire. The portion of New England Route 10 in Connecticut used the alignments of the Middlesex and Granby Turnpikes. In the 1932 state highway renumbering, Route 10 was relocated to a different alignment beginning in New Haven instead. The Old Saybrook to Granby road was designated as Route 9.

In the mid-1950s and early 1960s, various plans for a freeway along the Route 9 alignment were developed. Construction also began on the Old Saybrook to Cromwell segment around this time. The freeway from I-95 to I-91 was completely open by 1969. Old Route 9 south of Middletown was re-designated as Route 9A (later to be designated as Route 154).

Several options were considered and then later abandoned for the freeway portion through Hartford and points north. By the mid-1960s, a Route 9 freeway alignment through Hartford was finally abandoned. Route 9 was truncated to end at I-91 in Cromwell instead. The portion of old Route 9 from Hartford to Granby was assigned as an extension of Route 189, while the Cromwell to Hartford segment that was not upgraded to freeway was re-designated as Route 99.

In 1979, the eastern end of the Route 72 freeway up to the Berlin Turnpike was completed, including a connector to the planned alignment of Interstate 291 in New Britain. By this time, however, this portion of Interstate 291 had been deleted from the state's Interstate network. By 1989, a freeway connection was completed between the north end of Route 9 at I-91 and the east end of Route 72 at the Berlin Turnpike. Route 72 was truncated to end at the I-291 connector while Route 9 was extended along the deleted portion of the Route 72 freeway. Route 9 also took over the I-291 connector, which was extended in 1986 to Route 175.

In 1992 Route 9 was finally connected to I-84 in Farmington using a portion of the cancelled I-291 right of way, completing Route 9 as it exists today. The segment between I-84 in Farmington and I-91 in Cromwell serves the areas through which the southwest leg of I-291 was to be built; I-291 would have provided a parallel route to the north connecting roughly between Exit 29 (Route 175) on Route 9, to a new exit north of Exit 22 on I-91.

Exit list
Exit numbers have been converted to mile-based numbering as of January, 2023.

References

Connecticut State Highway Log (2006)

External links

009
Transportation in Hartford County, Connecticut
Transportation in Middlesex County, Connecticut
Freeways in the United States